The Musée Bartholdi is a museum dedicated to French sculptor Auguste Bartholdi and is situated at 30 rue des Marchands in Colmar, at the artist's birthplace. The museum has the "Musée de France" label. In 2011, the building was labeled "Maisons des Illustres" by the Ministry of Culture and Communication. In the courtyard there is a statue named Statue des grands soutiens du monde. Two doors of the 17th century were registered as a monument historique on 18 June 1926. In 2012, the museum numbered over 16,000 visitors.

Works exhibited
Among many other, works by Bartholdi that can be seen in the museum include:
 preparatory models for monuments created by the sculptor in the city, namely the statue of General Rapp, the Roesselmann fountain, the Hirn monument, the Schwendi fountain, the statue of Martin Schongauer, the statue of Admiral Bruat, the statue of the small grower and the statue of Alsacian Cooper;
 preparatory models for the Lion of Belfort;
 the Martyr moderne symbolizing the ultimate patriotic uprising by Poland against the Russian tsars (allegory of the myth of Prometheus);
 a preparatory model of an ear of Liberty Enlightening the World, commonly known as the Statue of Liberty
 a preparatory model of a horse's head for the Fontaine Bartholdi;
 a collection of objects referring to the presence of a Jewish community in Alsace that has been well established for centuries.

In popular culture
The museum is featured in the 2019 documentary about Bartholdi and the Statue of Liberty, Liberty: Mother of Exiles.

See also
 List of single-artist museums
 Statue of Liberty Museum

References

External links
  Official site

Art museums and galleries in France
Museums in Colmar
Jewish museums in France
Museums devoted to one artist
Maisons des Illustres